Belajar dari Rumah (Study from Home or Learning from Home, abbreviated as BDR) is an Indonesian educational programming block created by Ministry of Education and Culture in TV Edukasi to facilitate education via television in times of COVID-19 pandemic. Originally aired in partnership with the Indonesian public television network TVRI, the block was moved to TV Edukasi starting in April 2021.

On weekdays, Belajar dari Rumah consisted of preschool program and instructional programming for all school levels (primary school, junior high school, and senior high school) as well as parenting program and selected national movies on primetime. On weekends, the block shows educational and cultural programming for all ages.

References

External links 
 Official website (survey page)

Impact of the COVID-19 pandemic on television
Indonesian television series
2020 Indonesian television series debuts
TVRI original programming
Television programming blocks in Asia